The Queensland Review is a peer-reviewed academic journal of Queensland studies published by Equinox Publishing, having been formerly published by Cambridge University Press. It was established in 1994 and publishes articles, interviews and commentaries on Queensland history, politics and culture. The editor-in-chief is Michael T. Davis (Griffith University).

References

External links 
 

Australian studies journals
Publications established in 1994
English-language journals
Cambridge University Press academic journals
Culture of Queensland